The R.301 locomotive was a steam locomotive with narrow gauge for passenger and freight service that served on the Sicilian narrow gauge railway network and of the former colonies, Eritrea and Libya.

History 
The R.301 (R signifies narrow gauge) locomotives  were designed and built in the 1910s by the Material and Traction Service of the FS in Florence for the FS' narrow gauge lines then under construction. The first batch of eleven R.301s, built by Costruzioni Meccaniche di Saronno (CEMSA), was delivered to the FS in 1912.

In the following years, the fleet was enlarged by an additional twenty units whose construction was split between O.M. of Saronno, the Officine Meccaniche of Milan,  Ansaldo and  Breda. The locos were distributed between the depots of Palermo S.Erasmo, Castelvetrano, and Porto Empedocle.

After 1918 thirteen R.301s were diverted to colonial railways: 
 nos. 15 and 32 went to Eritrea, 
 nos. 05 and 07 to Somalia,
 nos. 12, 13, 14, 25 and 26 to Tripolitania and 
 nos. 11, 21, 22 and 33 to Cyrenaica.

In 1922 a superheater version of the R.301 loco, the R.302, was launched. This locomotive was also produced by CEMSA. The performance of the R.302s exceeded expectations, so the decision was taken to convert a batch of twenty R.301 locomotives into R.302s. The work was completed in the mechanical and naval workshops of Pietrarsa by 1927.   The FS renumbered them from 023 to 042.

The R.301s acquitted themselves well in terms of reliability and performance both in Sicily and the colonies.
An R.301 was sold to the Ferrovia Alifana in 1944.

Features 
The R.301s were designed to solve the operational problems of the preceding locomotive designs, above all the poor performance of four axle,rigid wheelbase R.401s which damaged the track in the numerous curves typical for narrow gauge alignments. The choice of the 2-6-0 wheel arrangement made it possible to limit the axle load to below 11 tons for the coupled wheels, and the Bissel truck improved the xxx.

The locomotives were also equipped with large water tanks (4.5 m³) to ensure a sufficient range.
Upon testing, the R.301s exceeded expectations; on a constant slope of 25‰ and curves with a radius of 100m, they were able to haul 90t at 25 km/h.

The boiler of the R.301 had a 74.5m² heating surface and the diameter of the cylinders of 380  mm, and a tractive effort at rim of 6750kgf.

The locomotives were equipped with Hardy vacuum brake. This highly reliable system creates vacuum in the pipe by the use of a steam ejector and has no moving parts.

The only defect of the R.301, is the asymmetry of the running gear, which made the locos unidirectional.

Home sheds
Deposito Locomotive di Castelvetrano

Deposito Locomotive di Palermo Sant'Erasmo

Deposito Locomotive di Licata

Deposito Locomotive di Piazza Armerina

Deposito Locomotive di Porto Empedocle

Preserved locomotives 
  R.301.2 : Milan Museum of Science and Technology 
  R.301.27 : Exposed until 2009 on the seafront of Marsala, moved to the area of the  Associazione Carristi d'Italia   2022, abandoned at Castelvetrano station.
  R301.1, R.301.3, R.301.4 : incorporated in the Eritrean railway fleet.

References

Narrow gauge locomotives